Lahr Farm is a historic home and farm located in Warwick Township, Chester County, Pennsylvania.  The farm has three contributing buildings; the main house, bank barn, and wash hour or latchen.  The house is a -story, four-bay by two-bay, fieldstone dwelling with a gable roof.  The farm remain in the Lahr family from 1834 to 1938.

It was added to the National Register of Historic Places in 1979.

References

Farms on the National Register of Historic Places in Pennsylvania
Houses in Chester County, Pennsylvania
National Register of Historic Places in Chester County, Pennsylvania